Mark Robert Clifford (born 11 September 1977) is an English former professional footballer who played in the Nationwide Conference and Football League for Boston United and Mansfield Town.

Clifford is the owner of Ilkeston Town, having previously also been manager.

References

1977 births
Living people
English footballers
Association football defenders
English Football League players
National League (English football) players
Mansfield Town F.C. players
Ilkeston Town F.C. (1945) players
Stamford A.F.C. players
Boston United F.C. players
Chester F.C. players
Nuneaton Borough F.C. players
Basford United F.C. managers